Winterborn is a 1978 Danish drama film directed by Astrid Henning-Jensen. It was entered into the 29th Berlin International Film Festival where Henning-Jensen won the Silver Bear for Best Director.

Cast
 Ann-Mari Max Hansen - Marie
 Helle Hertz - Signe
 Lone Kellerman - Olivia
 Lea Risum Brøgger - Linda
 Berrit Kvorning - Gertrud
 Birgit Conradi - Karen Margarethe
 Mimi Vang Olsen - Habiba
 Merete Axelberg - Veronica
 Lene Brøndum - Tenna
 Ulla Gottlieb - Yvonne
 Jannie Faurschou - Connie
 Susanne Breuning - Eva - Maries søster
 Else Benedikte Madsen - Fru Holm
 Johannes Rosing - Zacharias - Maries kæreste
 Waage Sandø - Jacob - Signes mand
 Benny Poulsen
 Kurt Ravn
 Beatrice Palner
 Kjeld Nørgaard
 Jesper Christensen
 Ole Thestrup
 Elin Reimer
 Henning Palner

References

External links

1978 films
1970s Danish-language films
1978 drama films
Films directed by Astrid Henning-Jensen
Danish drama films